The European Union (EU) publishes a list of air carriers that are banned from entering the airspace of any of its member states, usually for failing to meet EU regulatory oversight standards. The first version of the list was published in 2006, on the legal basis of Regulation No. 474/2006 of the European Commission, issued on 22 March of that year. The current version of the list was published on 23 November 2022.

Legal procedure
The process by which an air carrier is listed is laid out in Regulation (EC) No 2111/2005 of the European Parliament and Council. It involves consultation among the regulatory agencies of the member states, the institutions of the European Community, the authorities with responsibility for regulatory oversight of the air carrier concerned, and the air carrier itself. Before being listed, each air carrier has the right of appeal. The list is subject to periodic review.

In June 2016, all restrictions on Air Madagascar, Iran Air, Lion Air, Citilink, Batik Air, and all Zambian airlines were removed from the list of air carriers banned in the EU.

On 30 November 2017, Avior Airlines from Venezuela was added to the list because of "unaddressed safety deficiencies." No further details were given at the time.

On 14 June 2018, all remaining Indonesian airlines not already removed from the list were removed from the list of air carriers banned in the EU.

On 3 February 2019, Turkmenistan Airlines was banned from European Union airspace, "pending confirmation that it meets international air safety standards", but the ban was lifted on 16 October 2019.

On 8 December 2019, Gabon's airlines were removed from the list, while the Armenian Civil Aviation Committee was "put under heightened scrutiny because of signs of a decrease in safety oversight", and a new update to the list was published on the next day.

As of January 2020, Syria's airlines are not specifically mentioned on the list, but in practice there is a ban against them in the context of the general EU sanctions against Syria.

In response to the government of Belarus forcing Ryanair Flight 4978 to divert and land in Minsk to arrest dissident Roman Protasevich, EU leaders announced that they would ban Belarusian carriers from using EU airspace and vice versa on 24 May 2021.

In response to the 2022 Russian invasion of Ukraine, the President of the European Commission, Ursula von der Leyen announced that Russian owned, Russian registered or Russian controlled aircraft would not be permitted to take-off, land, or overfly EU airspace.

List of air carriers

Banned airlines by country
Banned air carriers could be permitted to exercise traffic rights by using wet-leased aircraft of an air carrier which is not subject to an operating ban, provided that the relevant safety standards are complied with. The list includes the following airlines, with the airline license having been issued in the respective countries:

Annex B
Annex B of the EU list covers airlines which are restricted to operating only certain aircraft within the EU.

Former banned airlines by country

See also 
 EUROCONTROL
 European Aviation Safety Agency
 Joint Aviation Authorities

References

Bibliography
 Regulation (EC) No 2111/2005 of the European Parliament and of the Council of 14 December 2005 on the establishment of a Community list of air carriers subject to an operating ban within the Community and on informing air transport passengers of the identity of the operating air carrier
 Commission Regulation (EC) No 474/2006 of 22 March 2006 establishing the Community list of air carriers which are subject to an operating ban within the Community referred to in Chapter II of Regulation (EC) No 2111/2005 of the European Parliament and of the Council

Citations

External links 
 The EU Air Safety List at the European Commission Directorate-General for Energy and Transport
 Questions and answers on the list of air carriers subject to an operating ban in the EU (the "black list")

Airline-related lists
Aviation safety in Europe
European Union regulations
European Union-related lists